The 1997–98 Whitbread Round the World Race was the seventh edition of the around-the-world sailing event Whitbread Round the World Race. The Whitbread Round the World Race ran for the first time with all W60 boats and to a "points vs time" (instead of aggregate leg time) scoring system to enhance the value of the shorter race legs.

Also, in an effort to attract additional media coverage, the Whitbread race committee divided the race into no less than 9 legs for the 1997 to 1998 race, therefore increasing the number of ports visited.

Volvo had its first major association with the race in 1997 to 1998 by sponsoring the trophy (thus the race was officially known as the Whitbread 'round the world race for the Volvo Trophy) and some of the media coverage. For the first time running to W60-only specification, this year's Whitbread attracted just 10 entries—the fewest to date.

Participants

America's Challenge
Led by Neil Barth and skippered by Ross Field, the team bought Yamaha before building America’s Challenge. The team struggled for funding and withdrew from the race in Cape Town. The crew included a group of New Zealanders, including Jared Henderson, and the UK's Matthew Humphries.

Brunel Sunergy
Skippered for the first six legs by Hans Bouscholte, the crew included Gerald Rogivue and Peter van Niekerk. Because of bad results, Hans Bouscholte was replaced by the Team director Roy Heiner in the last three legs.

Chessie Racing
Skippered by 57-year-old George Collins, the crew included John Kostecki, Juan Vila, Gavin Brady and Ken Read.

EF Education and EF Language
EF Language was skippered by Paul Cayard and included a core crew from his AmericaOne challenge for the 2000 America's Cup. Lawrie Smith was originally intended to lead the boat, until transferring to Silk Cut. The crew included Steven Erickson and Magnus Olsson

The team's second boat, EF Education, had an all-female crew and was led by French woman Christine Guillou and included Isabelle Autissier. Leslie Egnot joined the crew on leg 4.

Kvaerner Innovation
Skippered by Knut Frostad, the crew included Marcel van Triest, Ross Halcrow, Tony Rae, Ed Baird, Torben Grael and Pierre Mas.

Merit Cup
Merit Cup was a Monaco flagged boat skippered by Grant Dalton. One of only two team's that built two boats, the crew included watch captain Kevin Shoebridge, Ian Stewart, Mike Sanderson, Jeremy Lomas, Dirk de Ridder, Ray Davies and Mike Quilter.

Silk Cut
Led by Lawrie Smith, Silk Cut was the last boat in the fleet designed by Bruce Farr. The crew included Jez Fanstone, Neil Graham, Gordon Maguire, Neal McDonald, Jan Dekker and Stu Bannatyne.

Swedish Match
Swedish Match was skippered by Gunnar Krantz and included Roger Nilson and Erle Williams. Matthew Humphries joined the crew following the withdrawal of America's Challenge.

Toshiba
Led by Dennis Conner and Paul Standbridge, Toshiba was originally skippered by Chris Dickson but Dickson was fired after Leg 1. Other crew members included Ross MacDonald, Murray Ross, Chris Ward, Alan Smith and Kelvin Harrap.

The crew had 13 Whitbread and 28 America's Cup campaigns between them.

Route

Leg Results

Overall Results

References

External links

The Ocean Race
Whitbread Round The World Race, 1997-98
Whitbread Round The World Race, 1997-98
1998 in New Zealand sport